Freyeria is a genus of butterflies in the family Lycaenidae erected by Ludwig Georg Courvoisier in 1920.

It currently includes three species:

Freyeria putli (Kollar, [1844]) – eastern grass jewel – Ceylon, South India, northeast India, Australia (Northern Territory, Queensland), Ryukyu Islands
Freyeria minuscula (Aurivillius, 1909) – Madagascar
Freyeria trochylus (Freyer, 1845) – grass jewel – Africa, Arabia, Bulgaria, Greece, Asia Minor, southern Asia

References

External links

Polyommatini
Lycaenidae genera